The Embassy of the Republic of Poland in Uzbekistan is the diplomatic mission of the Republic of Poland to the Uzbekistan. The territorial competence of the Embassy includes Uzbekistan and Tajikistan.

Structure  
 Ambassador Extraordinary and Plenipotentiary - Head of the Representative Office
 Political and Economic Department
 The Consular Department
 Administrative and Financial Department
 Military attache

See also 
 Diplomatic missions in Uzbekistan

References 

Buildings and structures in Tashkent
Poland
Diplomatic missions of Poland